"Dardanella" is a popular song published in 1919 by McCarthy & Fisher, Inc., a firm owned by Fred Fisher, lyricist, for music composed by Felix Bernard and Johnny S. Black.

Bandleader Ben Selvin (1898–1980) recorded "Dardanella" for several record labels (including Victor and Paramount). His main recording was made for Victor on November 20, 1919, under the name of Selvin's Novelty Orchestra. It was released December 1919, reaching number one the following month, a position It held for 13 weeks. It also ranked number one for the year 1920, and was the second-highest selling single of the 1920s. Selvin's recording broke records by becoming the first record to sell more than three million copies, and would go on to sell more than 5 million.

As with most hit records of the time, the market was soon rife with unauthorized copies of the tune. A front page ad in Variety (January 2, 1920) warned "thieves and pirates" not to "imitate, copy or steal any part of 'Dardanella'." There were, however, a number of other successful recordings in 1920, by Prince's Orchestra, Harry Raderman's Jazz Orchestra, and Henry Burr and Albert Campbell.

Notable subsequent recordings were by Acker Bilk and His Paramount Jazz Band (included in his album A Stranger No More); by Bing Crosby and Louis Armstrong on their 1960 album Bing & Satchmo, and by Geoff Muldaur and Maria Muldaur on their 1974 Warner/Reprise album, "Sweet Potatoes," featuring Amos Garrett.

Notes

Bibliography
Fisher, Fred (w.); Felix Bernard/Johnny S. Black (m). "Dardanella" (Sheet Music). New York: McCarthy & Fisher (1919).

External links
"Dardanella" (instrumental), Selvin's Novelty Orchestra (Victor 18633, 1919) at the Internet Archive.

1919 songs
Songs written by Fred Fisher
Songs with music by Felix Bernard